Events in the year 2021 in Trinidad and Tobago.

Incumbents
 President: Paula-Mae Weekes
 Prime Minister: Keith Rowley
 Chief Justice: Ivor Archie

Events
Ongoing — COVID-19 pandemic in Trinidad and Tobago

Scheduled events 
Due in 2021 – The 2021 Tobago House of Assembly election.
January 2021 Tobago House of Assembly election
December 2021 Tobago House of Assembly election

Deaths
 January 28 – Singing Sandra, 64, calypso singer.
 March 28 – Louise Horne, 108, politician and nutritionist, senator (1976–1991).
 April 10 – Mike Olton, 82, Trinidadian-born English cricketer (Kent, Trinidad national team).
 April 17 – Franklin Khan, politician.
 May 25 – Torrance Mohammed, 90, dancer and politician.
 July 13 – Brother Resistance, 66–67, musician and poet.
 October 21 – Yasin Abu Bakr, 80, religious leader and insurgent.

References

 
2020s in Trinidad and Tobago
Years of the 21st century in Trinidad and Tobago
Trinidad and Tobago
Trinidad and Tobago